Events from the year 1940 in Romania.

Incumbents
King: Carol II (until September 6), then Michael
Prime Minister: Ion Gigurtu (until September 4), then Ion Antonescu

Events
June 28–July 4 – Soviet occupation of Bessarabia and Northern Bukovina
July 1 – Dorohoi pogrom
September 7 – Treaty of Craiova
September 8 – Nușfalău massacre
September 9 – Treznea massacre
September 13/14 – Ip massacre
November 10 – 1940 Vrancea earthquake
November 26 – Jilava Massacre

Births
January 6 – Doina Badea, singer of popular music (died 1977)
January 7 – Florentina Mosora, biophysicist and film actress (died 1996)
January 23 – Ileana Mălăncioiu, poet, essayist, and journalist 
February 9 – Simion Surdan, footballer (died 2006)
February 24 – Nicolae Martinescu, Olympic wrestler (died 2013)
February 26 – Alexandru Repan, actor
March 12 – Virgil Nemoianu, essayist and literary critic
May 3 – Marin Ferecatu, Olympic shooter
May 17 – Valeriu Pantazi, poet, writer, and painter (died 2015)
April 17 – Ștefan Gușă, general and Chief of the General Staff, 1986–1989 (died 1994)
June 18 – Nadia Ileana Bogorin, First Lady of Romania, 1996–2000
August 1 – Simion Popescu, Greco-Roman wrestler
September 19 – Nicolae Bărbășescu, biathlete
October 25 – Olimpia Cataramă, Olympic athlete
November 1 – Alexandru Cecal, chemist (died 2021)
November 19 – Cornel Oțelea, handball player
December 24 – Constantin Oțet, football coach (died 1999)

Deaths
February 27: Nicolae Tonitza, painter (born 1886).
July 21: Traian Bratu, academic and politician (born 1875).
September 8: Constantin Banu, writer, journalist, and politician (born 1873). 
November 20: Ioan Moța, priest and journalist 1868).
November 26 (killed in the Jilava Massacre):
Gheorghe Argeșanu, major general and politician (born 1883).
Ioan Bengliu, Inspector-General of the Romanian Gendarmerie (born 1881).
Victor Iamandi, politician (born 1891).
Gabriel Marinescu, brigadier general and politician (born 1886).
Mihail Moruzov, founder of the Romanian Secret Intelligence Service  (born 1887).
Aristide Macoveanu, major
Iosif Dinulescu, major
November 27:
Nicolae Iorga, historian and politician, Prime Minister in 1931–1932 (born 1871).
Virgil Madgearu, economist, sociologist, and politician (born 1887).

References

Years of the 20th century in Romania
1940s in Romania
 
Romania
Romania